Streptobacillus is a genus of fastidious microaerophilic Gram-negative bacteria, which grow in culture as rods in chains.

Species associated with infection - S. moniliformis

Reported susceptibilities and therapies - penicillin, erythromycin

Diseases
Associated infections: the Haverhill fever form of rat bite fever. (Notes Spirillum minus is also an agent of rat bite fever, in the form known as sodoku.)

Haverhill fever, which is characterized by fever, rash, chills, headache, vomiting, muscle pain, arthritis, and bacteremia, and by weight loss and diarrhea in children.

Commentary
Rat bite fever is caused by either Streptobacillus moniliformis or Spirillum minor. The incidence of rat-bite fever is highest in urban areas with poor sanitation where the rat population is high, however in recent times cases have also been attributed to occupational contact with rodents such as pet shop employees or laboratory workers or through pet ownership.

While the disease is usually caused by a bite, it can also occur from close contact with rodents or ingestion of contaminated food or water. The latter is known as Haverhill fever. The disease typically presents with chills and fever accompanied by headache, vomiting, and muscle pain. A rash and arthritis develop 2–4 days after the initial onset. Less commonly the infection can cause pneumonitis, endocarditis or meningitis. As these symptoms are common to many febrile diseases, this is often classified as a fever of unknown origin (FUO). If untreated, death will occur in approximately 10% of cases.

Phylogeny
The currently accepted taxonomy is based on the List of Prokaryotic names with Standing in Nomenclature (LPSN) and National Center for Biotechnology Information (NCBI)

See also
 List of bacterial orders
 List of bacteria genera

References

External links
 A Web-Surfer's Guide to Bacteria Associated with Infections in Humans
 Streptobacillus moniliformis
 

Bacteria genera
Rodent-carried diseases
Fusobacteriota